Poimapper is field data collection, sharing and analysing software.

Mobile application is used to collect data and update data. By uploading data to a cloud server it is shared among other mobile and office workers.

Poimapper is developed by Pajat Solutions Ltd. Pajat Solutions was founded in 2009 and is headquartered in Finland.  In 2013 Pajat was awarded the European CSR award for innovative, non-business partnerships that have helped to solve social problems while creating business advantage. The award came from a partnership where NGO's like Plan International were using Poimapper in their health-related monitoring and evaluation work.

References

External links

Data analysis software